The International Tropical Timber Agreement (ITTA), 1983) is an agreement to provide an effective framework for cooperation between tropical timber producers and consumers and to encourage the development of national policies aimed at sustainable utilization and conservation of tropical forests and their genetic resources.
The International Tropical Timber Organization was established under this agreement, which first opened for signature on November 18, 1983, then Entered into force on April 1, 1985. There were subsequent treaties, with an increasing number of signatories, in 1994 (ITTA2) and 2006 (ITTA3).

ITTA2 (1994) was drafted to ensure that by the year 2000 exports of tropical timber originated from sustainably managed sources and to establish a fund to assist tropical timber producers in obtaining the resources necessary to reach this objective.
It further defined the mandate of the International Tropical Timber Organization. The agreement was opened for signature on January 26, 1994, and entered into force on January 1, 1997.

ITTA3 (2006) aimed to "promote the expansion and diversification of international trade in tropical timber from sustainably managed and legally harvested forests and to promote the sustainable management of tropical timber producing forests". It entered into force on 7 December 2011.

Parties
Fifty eight parties signed up to the 1983 agreement:
Australia, Austria, Belgium, Bolivia, Brazil, Burma, Cameroon, Canada, People's Republic of China, Colombia, Democratic Republic of the Congo, Republic of the Congo, Ivory Coast, Denmark, Ecuador, Egypt, European Union, Fiji, Finland, France, Gabon, Germany, Ghana, Greece, Guyana, Honduras, India, Indonesia, Ireland, Italy, Japan, South Korea, Liberia, Luxembourg, Malaysia, Nepal, Netherlands, New Zealand, Norway, Panama, Papua New Guinea, Peru, Philippines, Portugal, Russia, Spain, Sweden, Switzerland, Thailand, Togo, Trinidad and Tobago, United Kingdom, United States, Venezuela

Sixty-two parties ultimately ratified the 1994 agreement:
Australia, Austria, Belgium, Bolivia, Brazil, Burma, Cambodia, Cameroon, Canada, Central African Republic, People's Republic of China, Colombia, Democratic Republic of the Congo, Republic of the Congo, Ivory Coast, Denmark, Ecuador, Egypt, European Union, Fiji, Finland, France, Gabon, Germany, Ghana, Greece, Guatemala, Guyana, Honduras, India, Indonesia, Ireland, Italy, Japan, South Korea, Liberia, Luxembourg, Malaysia, Mexico, Nepal, Netherlands, New Zealand, Nigeria, Norway, Panama, Papua New Guinea, Peru, Philippines, Poland, Portugal, Spain, Suriname, Sweden, Switzerland, Thailand, Togo, Trinidad and Tobago, United Kingdom, United States, Uruguay, Vanuatu, Venezuela

As of October 2018, there are 74 parties to ITTA3. Nigeria and Paraguay have signed the agreement but have not ratified it. Canada ratified the agreement in 2009 but has since denounced it.

References

External links 
International Tropical Timber Organization
Ratifications.
Text of the Agreement

Environmental treaties
United Nations treaties
Treaties of Australia
Treaties of Austria
Treaties of Belgium
Treaties of Bolivia
Treaties of the military dictatorship in Brazil
Treaties of Myanmar
Treaties of the People's Republic of Kampuchea
Treaties of Cameroon
Treaties of Canada
Treaties of the Central African Republic
Treaties of the People's Republic of China
Treaties of Colombia
Treaties of Zaire
Treaties of the Republic of the Congo
Treaties of Ivory Coast
Treaties of Denmark
Treaties of Ecuador
Treaties of Egypt
Treaties entered into by the European Union
Treaties of Fiji
Treaties of Finland
Treaties of France
Treaties of Gabon
Treaties of Germany
Treaties of Ghana
Treaties of Greece
Treaties of Guyana
Treaties of Honduras
Treaties of India
Treaties of Indonesia
Treaties of Ireland
Treaties of Italy
Treaties of Japan
Treaties of South Korea
Treaties of Liberia
Treaties of Luxembourg
Treaties of Malaysia
Treaties of Nepal
Treaties of the Netherlands
Treaties of New Zealand
Treaties of Norway
Treaties of Panama
Treaties of Papua New Guinea
Treaties of Peru
Treaties of the Philippines
Treaties of Portugal
Treaties of Spain
Treaties of Suriname
Treaties of Sweden
Treaties of Switzerland
Treaties of Thailand
Treaties of Togo
Treaties of Trinidad and Tobago
Treaties of the United Kingdom
Treaties of the United States
Treaties of Uruguay
Treaties of Vanuatu
Treaties of Venezuela